Thai Sollai Thattathe is a 1961 Indian Tamil-language action drama film directed by M. A. Thirumugam. The film stars M. G. Ramachandran and B. Saroja Devi, with M. R. Radha, S. A. Ashokan, V. R. Rajagopal, and P. Kannamba in supporting roles. It revolves around a police officer who is tasked with apprehending his brother, a criminal.

Thai Sollai Thattathe was produced by Sandow M. M. A. Chinnappa Thevar, and written by Aaroor Dass. The film was released on 7 November 1961, the occasion of Diwali, and was a commercial success, running for 20 weeks in theatres.

Plot 

Raju is an honest police inspector working hard to bring down a group of thieves. After completing a successful mission, he gets transferred to Madras to investigate about the robbery case that occurred in a train and a murder case that occurred near the seashore. While on his mission, he crosses paths with Vijaya, the daughter of a private banker Pandithurai and they both fall in love. But things take an unfortunate turn when Raju realises the criminal he is hunting is none other than his brother Mohan. What happens next forms the crux of the story.

Cast 
 M. G. Ramachandran as Raju
 B. Saroja Devi as Vijaya
 M. R. Radha as Pandithurai alias Parangusam
 S. A. Ashokan as Mohan
 V. R. Rajagopal as Pandithurai's sidekick
 Sandow M. M. A. Chinnappa Thevar as Pandithurai's henchman
 P. Kannamba as mother of Raju and Mohan
 Senthamarai as Inspector of police
 Gemini Chandra as Rajathi

Production 
Thaai Sollai Thattathe was edited and directed by M. A. Thirumugam and produced by M. M. A. Chinnappa Thevar under Thevar Films. The script was written by Aaroor Dass and the cinematography was handled by C. V. Murthi. The film saw Ramachandran and Thevar collaborating again after a brief misunderstanding. Production was completed in one month.

Soundtrack 
The music was composed by K. V. Mahadevan, with lyrics by Kannadasan. The song "Kaattukulle Thiruvizha" attained popularity.

Release 
Thai Sollai Thattathe was released on 7 November 1961 and ran for 20 weeks in theatres. According to R. Kannan, the author of the biography MGR: A Life, the film helped rehabilitate Ramachandran's "image as a dutiful actor".

References

Bibliography

External links 
 

1960s action drama films
1960s Tamil-language films
1961 drama films
1961 films
Films directed by M. A. Thirumugam
Films scored by K. V. Mahadevan
Indian action drama films